Trude Margaret Stendal (born 30 May 1963 in Bergen) is a Norwegian former footballer. She played as a forward for Toppserien club IL Sandviken and the Norway women's national football team. She scored twice in the Norwegians' 2–1 win over Sweden in the final of the 1987 European Competition for Women's Football. During her football career Stendal also worked in a bank. She trained as a nurse when injury brought about her premature retirement from football.

Stendal had injured her knee in a match against the United States a month after the Euro 1987 final. After making her comeback, she broke her leg in a 1991 Norwegian Women's Cup match against Trondheims-Ørn and was forced to retire.

References

External links 
 Profile at Football Association of Norway (NFF)

1963 births
Living people
Footballers from Bergen
Norwegian women's footballers
Norway women's international footballers
SK Brann Kvinner players
SK Sprint-Jeløy (women) players
Toppserien players
UEFA Women's Championship-winning players
Women's association football forwards